Dionisio Point Provincial Park is a provincial park campground in the southern Gulf Islands of British Columbia, Canada. It is located at the northwestern tip of Galiano Island, across Porlier Pass from Valdes Island.

External links
Official website
A day hike in the Park
Dionisio Point Park
Quelus - a Place of Serenity (video)

Provincial parks of British Columbia
Galiano Island
Year of establishment missing